Jiří Plišek (born 21 August 1972) is a Czech professional football manager and former player.

Plíšek joined Czech First League side Hradec Králové as manager in the summer of 2012, replacing the outgoing Václav Kotal. He remained in his position until April 2013, when he was sacked.

He has managed both Željezničar from June to October 2004 and Sarajevo from July until December 2011.

References

1972 births
Living people
People from Aš
Czech footballers
Association footballers not categorized by position
Czech football managers
Czech expatriate football managers
Expatriate football managers in Bosnia and Herzegovina
Premier League of Bosnia and Herzegovina managers
Czech First League managers
FK Željezničar Sarajevo managers
FK Ústí nad Labem managers
1. FC Slovácko managers
FK Teplice managers
FK Sarajevo managers
FC Hradec Králové managers
Sportspeople from the Karlovy Vary Region
Czech National Football League managers